Candlemas Island is a small uninhabited island of the Candlemas Islands in the South Sandwich Islands.

On the northwest flank of the island is an active stratovolcano, Lucifer Hill, that showed signs of activity in 1911 and glowing lava flows during 1953–1954. Mount Andromeda and Mount Perseus are both glacier-covered peaks on the island.

The island's southeast point is called Shrove Point. It was named by Discovery Investigations personnel on the Discovery II because they charted it on Shrove Tuesday, March 4, 1930. Clapmatch Point forms the southwest point of the island.

Candlemas Island is the setting of a novel by Ian Cameron, The White Ship (1975), which tells of a disastrous expedition to the island in 1975 where members of the expedition must contend with ghosts of Spaniards shipwrecked on the island in 1818.

See also
 Breakbones Plateau
 List of Antarctic and sub-Antarctic islands
 List of volcanoes in South Sandwich Islands
 Tomblin Rock

References

 

volcano.und.edu

Islands of the South Sandwich Islands
Volcanoes of the Atlantic Ocean
Volcanoes of South Georgia and the South Sandwich Islands
Active volcanoes
Uninhabited islands of South Georgia and the South Sandwich Islands